The following is a list of mainstream films featuring skiing or snowboarding scenes.  Skiing has been recorded on film since at least the 1910s, but did not work its way into Hollywood features until the 1930s, when it began to be popular as a leisure activity in the United States.  Snowboarding's entry onto the screen paralleled its rise to popularity in the late 1980s and early 90s.

Action
Dusty Ermine (1936)
Ski Patrol (1940)
Northern Pursuit (1943)
Ski Troop Attack (1960)
The Heroes of Telemark (1965)
Footsteps In the Snow (1966)
Caprice (1967)
The Double Man (1967)
Assignment K (1968)
The Devil's Brigade (1968)
On Her Majesty's Secret Service (1969)
Snow Job (1972)
Runaway! (1973)
The Ultimate Thrill (1974)
Lone Wolf and Cub: White Heaven in Hell (1974)
The Spy Who Loved Me (1977)
Bear Island (1979)
For Your Eyes Only (1981)
The Soldier (1982)
A View to a Kill (1985)
Jing cha gu shi IV: Jian dan ren wu ( Police Story 4: First Strike or Jackie Chan's First Strike) (1995)
Hamilton (1998)
The World Is Not Enough (1999)
Extreme Ops (2002)
xXx (2002)
Deep Shock (2003)
Taxi 3 (2003)
Fantastic Four (2005)
Inception (2010)
The Last King (2016)
Kingsman: The Golden Circle (2017)

Animation
 The Insects' Christmas (aka Rozhdyestvo obitateli lyesa) (1911) short
 Betty Boop's Snow-White (1933) and Thrills and Chills (1940) shorts
 Looney Tunes' Alpine Antics (1936) short
 Popeye's I-Ski Love-Ski You-Ski (1936) and I’ll Be Skiing Ya (1947) shorts
 Goofy's The Art of Skiing (1941) short
Dumbo (1941)
Fox and Crow's Plenty Below Zero (1943) short
 Woody Woodpecker's Ski for Two (1944) short  
 Mr Magoo's The Ragtime Bear (1949) and Magoo Goes Skiing (1954) shorts
 Daffy Duck's Duck Amuck (1953) short
 Tom and Jerry's The A-Tom-Inable Snowman (1966) short
 Pink Panther's Pink Streaker (1975) short
Davey and Goliath's Snowboard Christmas (2005)

Comedy
Max Linder: Max Goes Skiing (1910), Max Asthmatique (1914), Max and His Mother-in-Law (1914) and Max Wins and Loses (1916), shorts
The Great Leap (1927) 
Love on Skis (1928)
The Champion of Pontresina (1934)
A Rare Bird (1935)
Schlitz on Mount Washington (1935)
Winter Night's Dream (1935)
The Moon's Our Home (1936)
Thin Ice (1937)
Dollar (1938)
Paradise for Three (1938)
Sun Valley Serenade (1941)
Two-Faced Woman (1941)
You Belong to Me (1941)
Hit the Ice (1943)
Love Goes Up and Down (1946)
Les Amours de Blanche Neige (1947)
The Singing Hotel (1953)
All for Mary (1955)
Three Men in the Snow (1955)
Fjols til fjells (1957)
The Pink Panther (1963)
Get Yourself a College Girl (1964)
Help! (1965)
Ski Party (1965)
Winter A-Go-Go (1965)
 (1966)
Wild Wild Winter (1966)
Caprice (1967)
Après-ski (a.k.a. Snowballin''') (1971)Snowball Express (1972)Blue Blooms the Gentian (1973)Beim Jodeln juckt die Lederhose (a.k.a. There's No Sex Like Snow Sex) (1974)Les Bronzés font du ski (1979)Sunnyboy und Sugarbaby (1979)The Four Seasons (1981)Copper Mountain (1983)Hot Dog... The Movie (1984)Snowballing (1984)Better Off Dead (1985)Sällskapsresan 2 – Snowroller (1985)Watashi o ski ni tsurete itte (a.k.a. Take Me Out to the Snowland) (1987)Ski Patrol (1990)Ski School (1991)Dumb and Dumber (1994)Ski Hard (a.k.a. Downhill Willie) (1995)Ski School 2 (1994)Snowboard Academy (1996)Extreme Days (2001)Out Cold (2001)The Ice Dream (2002) (2002)Agent Cody Banks (2003)Peak Experience (a.k.a. Lost Lake) (2003)Snow Job (a.k.a. Winter Break) (2003)Bridget Jones: The Edge of Reason (2004)Extreme Dating (2004)Snowfever (2004)Water to Wine (2004)Frostbite (2005)Swamper (2005)Shred (2008)Shred 2 (2009)Hot Tub Time Machine (2010)Chalet Girl (2011)The Anderssons Rock the Mountains (2014)The Grand Budapest Hotel (2014)Eddie the Eagle (2016) (a.k.a. Off Track) (2022)

DocumentaryMoscow Clad in Snow (1908) shortEin Heldenkampf in Schnee und Eis (1917)Put Your Cares on Ice (1919) short
  (1920)The White Stadium (1928)Se Norge (1929)Cinerama Holiday (1955)13 jours en France (1968)Die große Ekstase des Bildschnitzers Steiner (a.k.a. The Great Ecstasy of Woodcarver Steiner) (1974)The Man Who Skied Down Everest (1975)The Sword of the Lord (1976)White Rock (1977)Different Slopes (1979)Aspen (1991)Blizzard of AAHHH's (1988)Ski Bums (2001)Spirit of Snow (2002)Au: A Snowboarding Film (2005)Bode Miller: Flying Downhill (2005)First Descent (2005)Trulli Love (2005)The Pipe Dream (2006)Snow Blind (2006)Thermos (2006)Let It Ride: The Craig Kelly Story (2007)That's It, That's All (2008)The Art of Flight (2011)Ready to Fly (2012)

DramaAvalanche (1923)Body and Soul (1927)Confessions of a Co-Ed (1931)Young Sinners (1931)Service for Ladies (1932)Everything Happens at Night (1939)Escape (1940)The Mortal Storm (1940)Spellbound (1945)My Reputation (1946)Winter Wonderland (1946)Swiss Tour (a.k.a. Four Days Leave) (1949)The Young Lions (1958)Return to Peyton Place (1961)Snow Treasure (1968)Downhill Racer (1969)The Ski Bum (1971)
 The Stepdaughter (1974)The Other Side of the Mountain (1975)Just a Little Inconvenience (1977)The Other Side of the Mountain II (1978)Swan Song (1980)Going for the Gold: The Bill Johnson Story (1985)Striker's Mountain (1985)True Colors (1991)Aspen Extreme (1993)Winterschläfer (a.k.a. Winter Sleepers) (1997)Friends & Lovers (1999)Avalanche Alley (2001)Familie (2001)Getting There (2002)Stolen Good (2002)Crazy Canucks (2004)Last Holiday (2006)Matti: Hell Is for Heroes (2006)La Science des rêves (a.k.a. The Science of Sleep) (2006)White Air (2006)Switch (2007)Into the White (2012)Force Majeure (2014) (2020)Jump!! The Heroes Behind the Gold (2021)

HorrorJūjin Yuki Otoko (a.k.a. Half Human) (1955)Beast from Haunted Cave (1959)Snowbeast (1977)Iced (1988)Shredder (2003)Ice Queen (2005)Scarce (2008)Frozen (2010)The Truth Below (2011)

References

Skiing Catalog of Feature Films, American Film Institute
Senn, Bryan (2022) Ski Films A Comprehensive Guide McFarland 
Armstrong, Richard B.; Armstrong, Mary Willems (2009) Encyclopedia of Film Themes, Settings and Series, McFarland & Company Incorporated  page 183
Craddock, Jim (ed) (2007) VideoHound's Golden Movie Retriever Gale . Category Index: SkiingBowker's Complete Video Directory (1995) R.R. Bowker 
Halliwell and Walker (1993) Halliwell’s Filmgoer's and Video Viewer Companion Harper  page 703
Davidson & Adler (1993) Sport on Film and Video, New-York: The Scarecrow Press 
Wallenfeldt (1989) Sports Movies: A Guide to Nearly 500 Films Focusing on Sports'' 

Skiing
Skiing mass media